The following is a list of mixed-sex colleges and universities in the United States, listed in the order that mixed-sex students were admitted to degree-granting college-level courses.

Many of the earliest mixed-education institutes offered co-educational secondary school-level classes for three or four years before co-ed college-level courses began – these situations are noted in the parentheticals below.

Earliest mixed-sex higher education institutes (through 19th century)

 Schools that were previously all-female are listed in bold.

References

Coed